The women's 5000 meter at the 2021 KNSB Dutch Single Distance Championships in Heerenveen took place at Thialf ice skating rink on Sunday 1 November 2020.

Statistics

Result

Source:

Referee: Wycher Bos. Assistant: Björn Fetlaar  Starter: Janny Smegen 
Start: 14:21 hr. Finish: 15:03 hr.

Draw

References 

Single Distance Championships
2021 Single Distance